E3 ubiquitin-protein ligase UBR2 is an enzyme that in humans is encoded by the UBR2 gene.

Proteolysis by the ubiquitin-proteasome system controls the concentration of many regulatory proteins. The selectivity of ubiquitylation is determined by ubiquitin E3 ligases, which recognize the substrate's destabilization signal, or degron. The E3 ligase UBR2 participates in the N-end rule pathway, which targets proteins bearing an N-terminal degron, or N-degron (Kwon et al., 2003).[supplied by OMIM]

References

Further reading

External links